Taufkirchen is a small community south of Munich, near Oberhaching and Unterhaching in Bavaria, southern Germany.

The Realschule is named after Walter Klingenbeck. In general, the German location of EADS, more commonly called Airbus, is considered to be in the neighbouring community Ottobrunn, but most of the ground area belongs to Taufkirchen.

References

External links
Taufkirchen Guide
Freiwillige Feuerwehr Taufkirchen
Pfarrei St. Johannes der Täufer

Munich (district)